Bludoveček is a hamlet in the Bludov municipality in the Olomouc Region of the Czech Republic.

Etymology
The name is diminutive of Bludov (Castle).

Geography
Bludoveček is situated in hillside of Chocholík hill that is part of Hanušovice Highlands. A paved road connects the hamlet with Bludov and outskirt of Šumperk.

History

The Bludov Castle castle was founded in the 13th century, when exactly Bludoveček was established is unclear. Medieval buildings haven't been preserved. The oldest structure is a former granary but its age is unsure because the granary has not been archaeologically explored.

Demography
Bludoveček had about 27 people older than 18 years as of 2003. The number of younger persons is not available.

References

Populated places in Šumperk District
Bludov (Šumperk District)